Abigail Cowen (born March 18, 1998) is an American actress and model. She is known for playing Dorcas in Chilling Adventures of Sabrina and Bloom in Netflix's live-action adaptation of Winx Club titled Fate: The Winx Saga.

Early life
Cowen was born in Gainesville, Florida. She grew up on a farm with her brother Dawson. She took acting lessons as a child. She attended Oviedo High School, where she was an athlete in track and field. 
 
Cowen studied public relations at the University of Florida, then moved with her family to Los Angeles, California in 2016 to further pursue an acting career.

Career
Cowen started off her acting career at the age of 17, by playing Brooklyn in Fox's Red Band Society. In 2017, she played Vicki Charmichael in the second season of Netflix's Stranger Things. From 2017 to 2018, she played Mia Tanner in CBS's Wisdom of the Crowd. In 2018, she portrayed Eliza Hunter in Freeform's The Fosters, followed by Ricochet in YouTube's The Power Couple. In 2020, she made her film debut as Adrienne with I Still Believe.
 
From 2018 to 2020, Cowen portrayed Dorcas in Netflix's series Chilling Adventures of Sabrina. In 2021, she started playing Bloom, in Netflix's live-action adaptation of Winx Club titled Fate: The Winx Saga. She described Bloom as a stubborn, determined introvert, who discovers she has fire powers and is sent to the "Otherworld" to master them.
 
In 2021, Cowen starred as Fiona in Witch Hunt. On being asked whether the lessons she learnt on Chilling Adventures of Sabrina came in handy, she said “I feel like this film is so different. Yes, it is witchcraft, but they're very different characters. But just the magical element, I guess using my imagination in certain scenarios, you could say I was kind of used to. But it definitely was a completely different character, completely different type of project to tackle for me, which is fun and it was a challenge.” Next, she starred as Angel in Redeeming Love.

Filmography

Films

Television

Personal life
Cowen has been in a relationship with her Fate: The Winx Saga co-star Danny Griffin since September 2021.

References

External links
 

Living people
21st-century American actresses
Actresses from Gainesville, Florida
American film actresses
American television actresses
People from Gainesville, Florida
1998 births